Operation Doppelkopf and the following Operation Cäsar were German counter-offensives on the Eastern Front in the late summer of 1944 in the aftermath of the major Soviet advance in Operation Bagration with the aim of restoring a coherent front between Army Group North and Army Group Centre. The operation's codename was a reference to the German card game Doppelkopf.

Strategic situation
By the end of July 1944, Soviet mechanised forces had reached the Gulf of Riga following their headlong advance in the Kaunas and Šiauliai Offensives, part of the third and final 'pursuit' phase of the strategic offensive Operation Bagration. The Soviet 2nd Guards Army had exploited a breach between the German Sixteenth Army of Army Group North and the neighbouring Third Panzer Army of Army Group Centre, and severed the connection between them. German counter-attacks failed to restore it, and significant elements of the German armed forces were left isolated.

The Oberkommando des Heeres made immediate plans for an offensive to restore the connection between the two Army Groups.

Planning
A number of armoured formations were assembled under Army Group Centre in Courland with orders to attack towards Jelgava, cutting off the Soviet spearheads. The XXXX Panzer Corps, with the 7th and 14th Panzer Divisions, the Grossdeutschland Division and the 1st Infantry Division, was assembled at Liepāja / Libau, while the XXXIX Panzer Corps was assembled at Tauroggen.

Deployments

Wehrmacht
 Army Group Centre (Colonel-General Georg-Hans Reinhardt) (from 16 August)
 Third Panzer Army (General Erhard Raus) (from 16 August)
 XL Panzer Corps (General Otto von Knobelsdorff)
 XXXIX Panzer Corps (General Dietrich von Saucken)

Red Army
 Elements of 3rd Belorussian Front (General Ivan Chernyakhovsky)
 Elements of 1st Baltic Front (General Hovhannes Bagramyan)

The offensive
The operation commenced with an attack by the 7th Panzer Division on 15 August towards Kelmė. The main offensive began the following day, but there was strong resistance against the XXXX Panzer Corps from ten Soviet infantry divisions supported by three artillery divisions and anti-tank units.

Von Saucken's XXXIX Panzer Corps opened operations on 18 August. Its left flank, an ad hoc formation under Hyacinth Graf Strachwitz von Groß-Zauche und Camminetz, was preceded by a heavy artillery bombardment from the cruiser Prinz Eugen; forces inside the pocket attacked to link up with Strachwitz's force. Strachwitz reached Sixteenth Army at Tukums by midday.

By 27 August, the corridor between Third Panzer Army and Sixteenth Army had been enlarged to 18 miles in width, though the latter had come under renewed pressure from a fresh Soviet offensive against Riga. The operation had also failed in its more ambitious objectives of retaking Šiauliai or of cutting off the 6th Guards Army threatening Riga.

Operation Cäsar
A second German 'spoiling' attack, was planned to destroy Bagramyan's forces in the salient below Riga and push the front out to a straight line between the Segewold position and Šiauliai. The main strike force was the reorganised XXXIX Panzer Corps, Third Panzer Army having been placed under the temporary overall control of Army Group North. The attack began on 16 September, in response to the Soviet Riga Offensive Operation, but by 19 September it had ground to a halt in the face of intense Soviet resistance after having penetrated only a few miles. The German forces then assumed a defensive configuration.

Aftermath
The Red Army attacked again on 5 October, in the Memel Offensive Operation. Five days later, they reached the Baltic Sea and finally cut off Army Group North in what eventually became the Courland Pocket. The German XXVIII Corps was isolated from the remainder of Third Panzer Army in a bridgehead at Memel.

See also
 Operation Bagration, the preceding Soviet strategic offensive against Army Group Centre
 Baltic Offensive, the Soviet strategic offensive against Army Group North
 Battle of Narva - Battle of the Tannenberg Line (1944), the parallel defensive battles of Army Group North
 Army Group Centre

Footnotes

References

 
 Raus, E. Panzer Operations, Da Capo, 2005,

Further reading
The memoirs of Erhard Raus cover the operations of Third Panzer Army during this period in some detail.
Another former general and author, Gerd Niepold, wrote a book-length study, Panzeroperationen Doppelkopf und Casar (Mittler, 1987).

Doppelkopf
Doppelkopf
Doppelkopf
Doppelkopf
Military history of Lithuania during World War II
August 1944 events
Doppelkopf
Operation Doppelkopf
Latvian Soviet Socialist Republic
Generalbezirk Lettland